Eagle Squadron is a 1942 American war film directed by Arthur Lubin and starring Robert Stack, Diana Barrymore, John Loder and Nigel Bruce.  It was based on a story by C.S. Forester that appeared in Cosmopolitan magazine, and inspired by media reports of the fighting in the Battle of Britain, in particular, the American pilots who volunteered before the United States entered World War II,  to fly for the Royal Air Force in the actual Eagle Squadrons.

Plot
As war breaks out in Europe, young Americans Chuck S. Brewer (Robert Stack), Johnny M. Coe (Leif Erickson) and Wadislaw Borowsky (Edgar Barrier) cross the Atlantic to join the Royal Air Force. Assigned to the Eagle Squadron, made up of other American pilots, they make friends with Squadron Leader Paddy Carson (John Loder), and women flyers Anne Partridge (Diana Barrymore) and Nancy Mitchell (Evelyn Ankers). Chuck is immediately attracted to Nancy, but she already has a boyfriend, Hank Starr (Jon Hall), another pilot in the squadron.

Once they are trained as fighter pilots, on their first mission against a German air force base, Johnny and Chuck are shot down, and Johnny is killed. Chuck parachutes into the sea and is rescued, but back at the base, he learns that two other pilots trying to protect them when both Americans broke formation, were also killed.

At a military dance, Chuck and Anne arrange for a date that turns out to be a picnic with a group of evacuated children, interrupted by a German air raid. Later, Squadron Leader Carson, who also likes Anne, takes her to London, with Chuck following the pair. During the bombing of a hospital, Anne is wounded leading others out of the burning building, but finds her father, Sir James Partridge (Paul Cavanagh), a noted pacifist, who dies in her arms.

Chuck and Wadislaw, along with Carson, take part in a commando raid in France to capture a top-secret new "Leopard" German fighter. The mission ends with Carson and Wadislaw dead, but Chuck takes off and shoots his way out of enemy territory, bringing the stolen fighter aircraft back to England. At an award ceremony, both Chuck and Anne are decorated for their bravery, but the ceremony is cut short by another German air raid. Chuck, who has proposed to Anne, kisses her on the cheek before taking to the air.

Cast

 Robert Stack as Chuck S. Brewer 
 Diana Barrymore as Anne Partridge
 John Loder as Paddy Carson 
 Nigel Bruce as McKinnon 
 Jon Hall as Hank Starr 
 Eddie Albert as Leckie 
 Evelyn Ankers as Nancy Mitchell 
 Leif Erickson as Johnny M. Coe 
 Edgar Barrier as Wadislaw Borowsky 
 Isobel Elsom as Dame Elizabeth Whitby 
 Alan Hale Jr. as Olsen 
 Don Porter as Ramsey
 Frederick Worlock as Grenfall 
 Stanley Ridges as Air Minister 
 Gene Reynolds as The kid 
 Robert Warwick as Bullock 
 Clarence Straight as Chandler 
 Edmund Glover as Meeker 

 Gladys Cooper as Aunt Emmeline 
 Rhys Williams as Sgt. Johns 
 Paul Cavanagh as Sir James Patridge
 Gavin Muir as Major Severn 
 Richard Fraser as Lt. Jefferys 
 Richard Crane as Griffith 
 Howard Banks as Barker 
 Harold Landon as Welch 
 Todd Karns as Meyers 
 Charles King Jr. as Cadet Chubby 
 Jill Esmond as Phyllis 
 Ian Wolfe as Sir Charles Porter 
 Alan Napier as Black Watch officer 
 Harold De Becker as Pvt. Owen 
 Donald Stuart as Hoskins 
 Carl Harbord as Lubbock 
 Charles Irwin as Sir Benjamin Trask
 Florence Gill As Cockney 
 Olaf Hytten as Day Controller

Documentary version
The film began as a documentary on real Eagle Squadron pilots, with cooperation with the British Ministry of Information which provided actual aerial combat footage.

On October 23, 1940 producer Walter Wanger announced he would make Eagle Squadron for United Artists and that he wanted William Wellman to direct. On November 4, 20th Century Fox announced they were going to make a rival project, The Eagles Fly Again, with Henry Fonda and Don Ameche.

In November Wagner hired William Hird Bennett to write the script.

In March 1941 Wanger announced the film would be one of three pictures he would make for United Artists, the other being Sundown and So Gallantly Gleaming. In July Wanger said the film would be part of a four picture deal with UA, the others being Sundown, Cheyenne and To Be Or Not to Be. Harry Watts and Ernest Schoedsack would direct.

Wanger sent fellow producer Merian C. Cooper and directors Harry Watt and Schoedsack, to film the squadron in action. Watt and screenwriter Ian Dalrymple came from the British Crown Film Unit.

The film's producers identified six pilots who would serve as the focus of the film.  In September the New York Times reported that they had been shooting in England for three months, and the six men were Andrew Mamedoff, Gregory Daymond, Eugene Tobin, William R. Dunn, Luke Allen and Chesley G Petersen. Schoedsack said he did not want to focus on any particular flier in case one was shot down - that happened to Tobin in September. Schoedsack was forbidden to fly on missions because if he was shot down, as a civilian he would be subject to execution because he was not one of the armed forces.

The squadron continued to fight during filming in Britain, and several pilots were killed. Technical advisor John M. Hill, on leave from the RAF due to a war injury and an actual member of the Eagle squadron, was one of only four pilots of the 17-strong squadron to survive.

The six months of pre-production filming were fraught with many problems, including the reluctance of the Eagle Squadron pilots to take part. It ended with Watt and Dalrymple resigning.

Although the original documentary project was not possible, the footage shot would prove to be recycled for a new film.

Feature film production
In October 1941 Wagner sold his company, including sixteen properties, to United Artists, but kept the rights to Eagle Squadron. Wagner intended to set up a new company and make Eagle Squadron its first film.

On November 17 Wagner announced he had signed a deal to make movies at Universal, including Eagle Squadron. This film would no longer be a documentary but a fictional story, based on a magazine story by C.S. Forester. Norman Reilly Raine was writing the script. The film would use footage taken in England, but now the characters would be played by actors rather than real pilots.

Reportedly the fictional story had been an idea of Raine's, who sold it to Wanger, who then hired Forester to write it up as a magazine story.

In December 1941 Wanger announced the female lead would be played by Diana Barrymore who was appearing on stage in The Land is Bright. Other key roles went to Robert Stack, Leif Ericson and Jon Hall. (while Hall's role is small Wanger later put the actor in Arabian Nights).

In early January Universal announced that the director would be Arthur Lubin. Lubin got the job directing on the back of his success with Abbott and Costello.

Filming started 15 January. Location shooting took place at Universal Studio's backlot outside Los Angeles. Stack remembers Barrymore as "a sad and thoroughly mixed up lady" with "an inclination to drink away her problems, a fiery temper and an erratic emotional perspective. But she had neither the time nor the training to acquire the enormous technical foundation in acting that other members of her famous family had."

Eagle Squadron begins with the onscreen declaration, "This production was made possible through the cooperation of The British Air Ministry, The British Ministry of Information, The Royal Air Force [and] The Eagle Squadron of the R.A.F." Noted war correspondent and radio commentator Quentin Reynolds, who also documented the role of the Eagle squadrons, narrates an extended foreword.

Reception

Box office
Although real Eagle Squadron pilots disliked its fictionalization of their experiences, Eagle Squadron was a box office hit, earning a profit of $697,607. Variety said it earned $1.8 million in rentals in the US in 1942. Its San Francisco premiere at the Orpheum Theater, raised $200,000 in war bond sales.

Critical response
Critically, the film did not fare well. Bosley Crowther, in his review in The New York Times, thought the blending of fictional and real-life events was outlandish and dismissed the film as nothing more than a B film. He wrote that Eagle Squadron was "... far from the genuine drama about American fliers with the R. A. F. that it should be, but is rather a highfalutin war adventure film which waxes embarrassingly mawkish about English courage and American spunk."

See also
 A Yank in the R.A.F.
 International Squadron
 Higher Than a Kite

References

Notes

Citations

Bibliography

 Bernstein. Matthew. Walter Wanger: Hollywood Independent. St. Paul, Minnesota: Minnesota Press, 2000. .
 Cull, Nicholas John. Selling War: The British Propaganda Campaign against American 'Neutrality' in World War II. Oxford, UK: Oxford University Press, 1995. .
 Glancy, H. Mark. When Hollywood Loved Britain: The Hollywood 'British' Film 1939-1945. Manchester, UK: Manchester University Press, 1999. .
 Orriss, Bruce. When Hollywood Ruled the Skies: The Aviation Film Classics of World War II. Hawthorne, California: Aero Associates Inc., 1984. .

External links
 
 
 Short story based on the film in the June 1942 issue of Photoplay magazine.
Review of film at Variety

1942 films
1940s war films
American aviation films
American black-and-white films
American war films
Battle of Britain films
Film
1940s English-language films
Films directed by Arthur Lubin
Films produced by Walter Wanger
Films set in England
Films set in London
Films set in the 1940s
Universal Pictures films
World War II aviation films
World War II films made in wartime
Films scored by Frank Skinner
Films based on works by C. S. Forester